Alain Aspect (born 15 June 1947) is a French physicist noted for his experimental work on quantum entanglement.

Aspect was awarded the 2022 Nobel Prize in Physics, jointly with John Clauser and Anton Zeilinger, "for experiments with entangled photons, establishing the violation of Bell inequalities and pioneering quantum information science".

Education

Aspect is a graduate of the École Normale Supérieure de Cachan (ENS Cachan, today part of Paris-Saclay University). He passed the agrégation in physics in 1969 and received his PhD degree in 1971 from the École supérieure d'optique (later known as Institut d'Optique Graduate School) of Université d'Orsay (later known as Université Paris-Sud). He then taught for three years in Cameroon as a replacement for then compulsory military service.

In the early 1980s, while working on his doctorat d'État (habilitation thesis), he performed the Bell test experiments that showed that Albert Einstein, Boris Podolsky and Nathan Rosen's putative reductio ad absurdum of quantum mechanics, namely that it implied 'ghostly action at a distance', did in fact appear to be realized when two particles were separated by an arbitrarily large distance (see EPR paradox and Aspect's experiment). A correlation between the particles' wave functions remains, as long as they were once part of the same undisturbed wave function before one of the child particles was measured. He defended his 'doctorat d'État' in 1983 at Université Paris-Sud (today part of Paris-Saclay University).

Aspect received an honorary doctorate from Heriot-Watt University in 2008.

Research
Aspect's experiments, following the first experiment of Stuart Freedman and John Clauser in 1972, were considered to provide further support to the thesis that Bell's inequalities are violated in its CHSH version, in particular by closing a form of the locality loophole. However, his results were not completely conclusive since there were loopholes that allowed for alternative explanations that comply with local realism.

After his work on Bell's inequalities, Aspect turned toward studies of laser cooling of neutral atoms, and  Bose–Einstein condensates at the Kastler-Brossel Laboratory.

Aspect was deputy director of the French "grande école" École supérieure d'optique until 1994. He is a member of the French Academy of Sciences and French Academy of Technologies, and a professor at the École Polytechnique.

Distinctions
Aspect was elected a Foreign Member of the Royal Society (ForMemRS) in 2015. His certificate of election reads 

In 2005 he was awarded the gold medal of the Centre national de la recherche scientifique, where he is Research Director. The 2010 Wolf Prize in physics was awarded to Aspect, Anton Zeilinger and John Clauser. In 2013 Aspect was awarded both the Niels Bohr International Gold Medal and the UNESCO Niels Bohr Medal. In 2011, he was assigned the Medal of the City of Paris. In 2013, he was also awarded the Balzan Prize for Quantum Information Processing and Communication. In 2014, he was named Officer of the Legion of Honour.

Asteroid 33163 Alainaspect, discovered by astronomers at Caussols in 1998, was named after him. The official  was published by the Minor Planet Center on 8 November 2019.

Aspect was awarded the 2022 Nobel Prize in Physics alongside John F. Clauser and Anton Zeilinger "for experiments with entangled photons, establishing the violation of Bell's inequalities and pioneering quantum information science".

Honours and awards
Accolades received by Aspect include the following:

Honours
 2022 : Commander of the Legion of Honour.
 2014 : Officier of the Legion of Honour.
 2011 : Officier of the National Order of Merit.
 2011 : Commander of the Palmes académiques.
 2011 : Medal of the City of Paris. 
 2005 : Knight of the Legion of Honour.

Awards

 2022: Nobel Prize in Physics (with John Clauser and Anton Zeilinger)
 2013: Balzan Prize 
 2013: Niels Bohr International Gold Medal
 2013: UNESCO Niels Bohr Medal
 2013: Frederic Ives Medal / Quinn Prize - Awards 
 2012: Albert Einstein Medal
 2011: Herbert Walther award
 2010: Wolf Prize
 2005: CNRS Gold Medal
 1999: Gay-Lussac–Humboldt Prize
 1991: Fernand Holweck Medal and Prize
 1987: International Commission for Optics Award 
 1985: Commonwealth Award for Science and Invention
 1983: Prix Servant

Acknowledgement
 Member of the Academia Europaea
 Member of the French Academy of Sciences
 Member of the French Academy of Technologies
 Foreign Member of the Royal Society
 Foreign Associate of the National Academy of Sciences
 Associate Member of the Royal Academy of Science, Letters and Fine Arts of Belgium
 Corresponding member abroad of the Austrian Academy of Sciences
 Fellow of Optica

Honorary degrees
 2006: Université de Montréal
 2008: Australian National University
 2008: Heriot-Watt University
 2010: University of Glasgow
 2011: University of Haifa
 2014: University of Waterloo
 2018: City University of Hong Kong

References

Publications
  (co-author)
  (Introduction)

External links

 Aspect's homepage
 Atom Optics group, Laboratoire Charles Fabry, Institut d'Optique
 Biography at CNRS
 https://web.archive.org/web/20120320235756/http://www.lcf.institutoptique.fr/Groupes-de-recherche/Optique-atomique/Membres/Membres-permanents/Alain-Aspect  
 http://www.academie-sciences.fr/academie/membre/Aspect_Alain.htm 
 Alain Aspect International Balzan Prize Foundation
 Videos of Alain Aspect in the AV-Portal of the German National Library of Science and Technology
 

1947 births
Living people
People from Agen
French physicists
Members of the French Academy of Sciences
Wolf Prize in Physics laureates
Foreign associates of the National Academy of Sciences
Niels Bohr International Gold Medal recipients
UNESCO Niels Bohr Medal recipients
Albert Einstein Medal recipients
Foreign Members of the Royal Society
Members of the Royal Academy of Belgium
Members of Academia Europaea
Fellows of the American Physical Society
Members of the Austrian Academy of Sciences
École Normale Supérieure alumni
Academic staff of École Polytechnique
Nobel laureates in Physics
French Nobel laureates
Research directors of the French National Centre for Scientific Research